The list of ship decommissionings in 1979 includes a chronological list of all ships decommissioned in 1979.


See also 

1979
 Ship decommissionings
Ship